The Abruzzo regional election of 2014 took place on 25 May 2014.

The Democratic candidate Luciano D'Alfonso, a former Christian Democrat who had been mayor of Pescara in 2003–2009, defeated incumbent President Giovanni Chiodi of Forza Italia by a wide margin.

Results

References

Elections in Abruzzo
2014 elections in Italy
May 2014 events in Italy